The Duchess is a British comedy-drama television series created by and starring Katherine Ryan. It premiered on Netflix on 11 September 2020. On 29 April 2021, the series was cancelled after one series.

Cast and characters

Main
 Katherine Ryan as Katherine, a ceramics artist and Olive's mother
 Rory Keenan as Shep, Katherine's ex-partner, Olive's father and a former boy band member
 Katy Byrne as Olive, Katherine and Shep's nine-year-old daughter
 Steen Raskopoulos as Evan, Katherine's boyfriend and an orthodontist
 Michelle de Swarte as Bev, Katherine's best friend and business partner
 Sophie Fletcher as Jane, Millie's mother
 Doon Mackichan as Cheryl, Shep's fiancée

Recurring
 Beau Gadsdon as Millie, Olive's friend
 Tony Jayawardena as Mr. Michaels, Olive and Millie's headmaster
 Anwar Lynch as Tom, Bev's husband and Shep's former Tru-Se bandmate
 Ash Rizi as Gareth, Shep’s former Tru-Se bandmate
 Ciaran Dowd as Dave, Shep’s former Tru-Se bandmate 
 Geoff Norcott as Brian, Jane's husband
 Naz Osmanoglu as Leo, a hygienist at Evan's practice
 Maya Jama as Sandra, a dental nurse at Evan's practice

Guest
 Ajay Chhabra as Dr. Frederik, Katherine's fertility doctor
 Nathan Clarke as Jay
 Jacqueline King as Evan's mother
 Luis Soto as Evan's father
 Lorna Gayle as Seleena, from the adoption agency
 Natasha Radski as midwife
Thanyia Moore as an officiant

Episodes

Season 1 (2020)

Reception
On Rotten Tomatoes, the series holds an approval rating of 63% based on 19 reviews, with an average rating of 6/10. On Metacritic, the series has a weighted average score of 35 out of 100, based on 7 critics, indicating "generally unfavorable reviews".

Notes

References

External links
 
 

2020 British television series debuts
2020 British television series endings
2020s British comedy-drama television series
English-language Netflix original programming
Television series by 3 Arts Entertainment
Television series by Clerkenwell Films
Television shows set in London